This is a list of the annual prevalence of cannabis use by country (including some territories) as a percentage of the population. The indicator is an "annual prevalence" rate which is the percentage of the youth and adult population who have consumed cannabis at least once in the past survey year.

Table

See also

Adult lifetime cannabis use by country
Decriminalization of non-medical marijuana in the United States
Health issues and the effects of cannabis
Illegal drug trade
Legal and medical status of cannabis
Legality of cannabis by country
Removal of cannabis from Schedule I of the Controlled Substances Act
Single Convention on Narcotic Drugs

References

Further reading 
World Drug Report (WDR). Multi-year archive. United Nations Office on Drugs and Crime.
World Drug Report 2011.
These Are The European Nations That Smoke The Most Pot. By Nick Jardine. 18 October 2011. Business Insider.

External links 
 NSDUH: U.S. federal government study showing regional data on cannabis usage within each state.

 Annual cannabis use by country
Cannabis use
Cannabis-related lists